The Regional Transportation District, more commonly referred to as RTD, is the regional agency operating public transit services in eight out of the twelve counties in the Denver-Aurora-Boulder Combined Statistical Area in the U.S. state of Colorado. It operates over a  area, serving 3.08 million people. RTD was organized in 1969 and is governed by a 15-member, publicly elected Board of Directors. Directors are elected to a four-year term and represent a specific district of about 180,000 constituents.

It employed 2,888 people. It had a $675.5 million operating budget for the year of 2018. Google has RTD schedules attached to its trip planner, and 3rd party mobile applications are now available for the iPhone and other platforms.

RTD is constructing the voter-approved FasTracks transit expansion that will add  of new commuter rail and light rail,  of rapid transit bus service, 21,000 new parking spaces at rail and bus stations, and enhance bus service across the eight-county district.

History 

In the 1960s, the principal provider of public transportation was the Denver Tramway Company, which served the City and County of Denver, as well as older portions of Arvada, Aurora, Englewood, Golden, Lakewood, Westminster, and Wheat Ridge and smaller suburbs. In 1969, the 47th session of the Colorado General Assembly created the RTD to provide public transportation to five additional counties in the metropolitan area. In October 1970, RTD found it needed to establish a Northern Operations Group (NOG) to provide service to Boulder and Longmont.

The privately owned Denver Tramway Company continued its service under sponsorship of the City and County of Denver until 1971, when it was taken over by Denver Metro Transit, an entity created by the City and County of Denver. Suburban services only continued for those suburbs willing to contribute a subsidy.

By 1972, RTD had created a plan for a personal rapid transit (PRT) system in the area, which included  of PRT and extensive bus service throughout the areas served by RTD. Later that year, the Urban Mass Transportation Administration (UMTA) selected RTD to develop PRT as a demonstration project. In 1973, residents voted for a sales tax of 0.5% over the six counties served by RTD for ten years; 20% of the funds would be used for expanded bus services and the other 80% was earmarked for PRT construction, although that project was later scrapped. The tax became effective January 1, 1974 and was raised to 0.6% on May 1, 1983. On January 1, 2005 the tax rate increased to 1.0%.

In 1974, RTD acquired and consolidated the local bus systems. Denver Metro Transit became part of RTD in July 1974. RTD acquired the bus system in Boulder from the Public Service Company of Colorado. Other RTD acquisitions included Evergreen Transit, Longmont Mini, the Englewood-Littleton-Ft. Logan service, Public Service and Northglenn Suburban Service. RTD also acquired the privately owned Denver-Boulder Bus Company, which ran airport buses.

RTD expanded and improved service frequency in the mid-1970s, and its services were expanded to routes that commercial carriers previously operated, although inflation prompted RTD to implement a new fare structure in February 1978. On September 5, 1978, RTD completely replaced all bus routes, formerly mostly radials from downtown Denver following old streetcar routes, with new routes based on a grid system, numbered based on the hundred blocks of the street grid.  For instance, the new Colorado Blvd (4000 east block) route was number 40, and the new 10th Avenue (1000 north block) route was number 10. RTD reached a record number of weekday passengers in 1980, the same year it expanded the Park-n-Ride system and acquired 216 new buses, 89 of which were articulated. Work was also completed to make RTD's service more accessible to elderly and handicapped people.

State law required privatization of 20% of bus lines in 1989, with this quota increased to 35% in 2002. In September 1994 Downtown Express/High Occupancy Vehicle (HOV) lanes were opened to buses, and to carpools a year later.

In 1979 federal approval was granted for the 16th Street Mall in downtown Denver, originally known as Transitway. The project allowed express bus productivity to double and was eventually intersected by RTD's first light rail line, the D Line, at Stout and California streets. Construction began in 1980.

RTD opened the Central Corridor light-rail line in October 1994, bringing rail transit back to the region. The Southwest Corridor light rail line opened in 2000, followed two years later by the Central Platte Valley spur. In 2003 the downtown portion of the original line between Speer Boulevard and 14th Street was realigned as a result of construction of the Colorado Convention Center.

In April 2006 unionized transit workers of the Amalgamated Transit Union went on strike for the first time in 24 years, citing increased health care costs, mandatory overtime, and disproportionate wage increases relative to upper management. Workers walked off the morning of April 3, shutting down the light rail system and decreasing bus service to about 45% of its normal capacity, the remaining service being provided by existing RTD subcontractors Laidlaw, Connex, and First Transit. Laidlaw and Connex, whose workers are contracted rather than unionized, would take over many routes operated by RTD, albeit on a reduced schedule, while First Transit, whose workers are unionized, operated only its own routes due to its contract with its workers. A revised contract was approved by the union on April 7, and service resumed on April 10. The strike lasted a total of seven days, and although thousands of commuters were stranded by the strike, only a few backups were reported as customers made makeshift arrangements for commuting or waited out the strike.

The Southeast Corridor, a component of the Transportation Expansion Project, opened on November 17, 2006, followed by the West Rail Line on April 26, 2013. RTD's Market Street Station closed on May 11 and 12, 2014 and was replaced by the newer Union Station. The Free MetroRide service began along 18th and 19th streets between Union Station and Civic Center Station.

University of Colorado A Line became the first commuter rail line to open, on April 22, 2016, with the second, the first 6.2 mile segment of the B Line, officially opened on July 25, 2016. The light rail R Line to Aurora and Lone Tree opened on February 24, 2017.

RTD made significant service changes and suspended service on multiple bus and light rail lines due to the COVID-19 pandemic. The F line was suspended on September 20, 2020 and the C Line was suspended on January 10, 2021.

Fleet 
Gillig Low Floor buses make up most of the fleet, replacing the Orion V and Gillig Phantom buses that made up most of the fleet until the late 2000s.  In 2014, RTD began to receive New Flyer Xcelsior low floor buses for the free MetroRide and other routes. MCI and Neoplan vehicles are used as express buses and regional buses, including service to Denver International Airport branded as SkyRide. In 2016, RTD began receiving delivery of 36 BYD K10MR all-electric buses to be used on the 16th Street Mall, replacing the older locally built TransTeq EcoMark buses in use since 2001.

Siemens SD-100 and SD-160 are used as light rail vehicles. , the RTD light rail fleet had 172 light rail vehicles, serving  of track and 54 stations. For RTD's new commuter rail system, it uses Silverliner V's.

RTD's Current Rail Fleet for Light Rail & Commuter Rail:

Fares 

The RTD fare structure is based on a zone system for rail and a service level system for bus. Local/Limited bus routes or a trip on rail up to 2 zones costs $3, Regional routes or traveling 3 zones on rail costs $5.25, and travel on bus or rail to Denver International Airport costs $10.50. Seniors, students, people with disabilities, and Medicare recipients are eligible for reduced fares. Children below age 6 ride free when accompanied by an adult with proper fare; this offer is limited to three such children per adult passenger.  RTD also offers the following 24-Hour Passes: Local ($6) or a Regional/Airport ($10.50) which allow unlimited travel at the chosen fare level until 2:59 a.m. the day following the purchase.

The fare system was last updated in January 2016 in preparation for the completion of 4 FasTracks rail lines in 2016. The new simplified fare structure included the removal of the Express fare level, pared down the rail fare zones from 4 to 3, and consolidated the tiered SkyRide fares into a single Airport Fare. A new 24-Hour pass option was also introduced, allowing riders to take multiple trips at twice the cost of a one-way ticket. However, the base fare one-way fare was increased by 15% to $2.60, attracting criticism for disproportionately affecting low-income residents. In January 2019 RTD increased the base fare to $3, but also introduced fares of $1.80, $1.50 and $0.90 for those qualifying under a discount fare program.

A fare card program, in development for over four years by Xerox, is available through employers as the EcoPass, through colleges as the CollegePass, and to the general public as the MyRide Stored Value card. MyRide users receive a discount on fares.

As of 2018, RTD enforces transit code and fares with its own security employees as well as via contracts with local police departments and Allied Universal Security Service.

Bus-tracking 
In 2006/2007, RTD worked with the city of Boulder, the University of Colorado, and real-time bus-tracking outfit NextBus on a GPS-based system to help riders with bus arrival information at selected high-traffic stops, but the experiment proved to be unreliable and was discontinued. Several years later, RTD started making its bus location and route data available to third-party developers. Google Maps (website and mobile apps) started offering real-time bus information, as did various other mobile app developers with free or paid apps, such as the Transit app. In March 2017, RTD rolled out a new web-based tracking system, optimized for mobile devices, called Next Ride to track buses and light rail, predict arrivals, show nearby stops and routes.

Mobility as a service (MaaS) 
In February 2019, RTD became the first transit authority to integrate its public transport services into the Uber app, enabling Uber riders in Denver to select a new ‘Transit’ option within the app, powered by Moovit Transit APIs. Uber Transit users can plan their journey with real-time information and step-by-step directions. Included in this is the ability to purchase transit mobile tickets directly in the app, powered by Masabi's Justride mobile ticketing SDK.

Projects

Past projects

Downtown Express 

This project added HOV lanes to I-25 north of downtown Denver.  It also added several dedicated slip ramps for RTD buses to access several Park-n-Ride stations directly from the highway.  At the south end of the HOV lanes, buses had direct routes into Union Station or Market Street Station. The HOV lanes extended from I-25 to US 36, allowing regional and express routes running along US 36 to downtown Denver to bypass congestion around the Turnpike Tangle.  This project was completed in September 1994.

In 2006, the Downtown Express was renovated to include a toll lane, thereby converting the HOV lanes into high-occupancy toll lanes. This allows single-occupancy vehicles to pay a toll to use them. It was built to increase the overall usage and efficiency of the highway's HOV lanes. The project was completed on June 2, 2006.

Central Corridor 
The Central Corridor, a  light rail line, opened in October 1994. It was built along Welton Street, through the Five Points district along Stout Street and California Street, and following a railroad right-of-way from Colfax Avenue down to the intersection of I-25 and Broadway.  This line was built without the aid of tax increases or federal funds; however, extensions have been funded by the Federal Transit Administration and new tax measures. This line was built from 30th/Downing as the northern terminus to I-25/Broadway as the southern terminus.

Southwest Corridor 
After the success of the Central Corridor, the Southwest Corridor light rail route opened in July 2000. An  light rail line, the route runs from the terminus of the Central Corridor at I-25 & Broadway to Mineral Avenue in Littleton with five existing stations. The line has been popular, and the Park-n-Ride lots at its stations often experience parking shortages. This project built a light rail line from I-25/Broadway south to Littleton/Mineral alongside existing freight tracks used by BNSF next to Santa Fe Drive.

Central Platte Valley Corridor 

In April 2002, the Central Platte Valley (CPV) spur opened. It is a  branch with four stations that provides light rail access to numerous venues, including the Auraria Campus, Broncos Stadium at Mile High, Ball Arena, Elitch Gardens, Union Station and Coors Field. This project built light rail lines from 10th/Osage to Union Station.

T-REX Project 

In November 1999, Denver area voters approved a project, known as the T-REX, which involved reconstruction of I-25 between Broadway and Lincoln Avenue in Lone Tree, and I-225 between I-25 and Parker Road in Aurora, with widening of the road to five lanes and light rail being built. The highway project was completed on August 22, 2006. The light rail line, known as the Southeast Corridor, opened shortly after 11 a.m. on November 17, 2006.

West Rail Line 

The West Rail Line opened on April 26, 2013. It was the first completed rail line of the RTD FasTracks Project.  The  of light rail run between Denver Union Station and Jefferson County Government/Golden Station, adding 11 new stations, 6 park-n-rides, and 3 new call-n-rides.

FasTracks 
FasTracks is a major project underway to expand the Denver metro area's light rail and bus service and to add commuter rail service. A 2004 referendum approved tax increases to support FasTracks. As of December 2020, completed sections include the W Line to Golden (formerly West Line, light rail, opened 2013), the US 36 Bus Rapid Transit lanes and service to Boulder (Flatiron Flyer, 2016), the redevelopment of Union Station and surrounding area as a transportation hub and transit-oriented development (2014), the free MetroRide downtown circulator (bus, 2014), a segment of the B Line to Westminster (formerly Northwest Line, commuter rail, 2016), the University of Colorado A Line to Denver International Airport (formerly East Line, commuter rail, 2016), the R Line from Peoria Station in Aurora to Lone Tree Station (formerly I-225 Line, light rail, 2017), the G Line to Arvada (formerly Gold Line, commuter rail, 2019), the N Line to Thornton (formerly North Metro Line, commuter rail, 2020) and the E Line, F Line, and R Line extensions (Southeast Extension, light rail, 2019). Scheduled completion dates for remaining segments extend as far ahead as 2044.

References

External links 

 Official Website
 The Transit Alliance – A non-profit coalition promoting expanded rail and bus transit in the Denver Metro region.

 
Bus transportation in Colorado
Passenger rail transportation in Colorado
Denver metropolitan area
Transportation in Denver
Intermodal transportation authorities in Colorado
Transportation in Aurora, Colorado
Transit authorities with natural gas buses
1969 establishments in Colorado